Erik Torsten "Totta" Näslund (1 April 1945 – 19 June 2005) was a Swedish blues musician and actor.

Biography 
Näslund was born in Sandviken and grew up in the small northern town Köpmanholmen, but moved to Gothenburg in 1970 to find work. He was working in the Gothenburg docks when he joined Nynningen, a rock group with leftist political texts and inspired by the Russian Communist poet Mayakovsky. Totta Näslund became the group's main singer.

In the mid-1970s, Nynningen fused with Nationalteatern, a musical theater ensemble with many members. Totta Näslund joined the group as singer, guitar-player and actor. Nationalteatern developed away from the theater and became a straight rock group, a rock orchestra as they called themselves. Even though Totta never wrote any own songs for the band, he was probably the most prominent member, next to Ulf Dageby.

Nationalteatern was one of the many leftist music and theater groups that came together in 1977 to form Tältprojektet, The Tent Project, a musical theater performance on the history of the Swedish working class, which toured the country that summer. Totta Näslund played the Beggar, the central story telling character of the play, and he sang some of the lead songs, like Aldrig mera krig (Never War Again) and Vi äro tusenden (We are legion). Tältprojekted, a non-profit making experiment financed by its members and supporters, was highly successful.

In the beginning of the 1980s, Nationalteatern dissolved and Totta Näslund directed his full energy to his hobby project, Totta's Bluesband with lyrics in English and several smaller tours in the U.S.

In 1995, when Totta turned 50 years old, he decided to go for a solo career and has released 8 solo albums with mostly songs written directly for him by other artists, or covers of other songs.

One of Totta Näslund's main sources for inspirations was Bob Dylan, and in May 2005 he went to Dylan's hometown Hibbing, Minnesota despite his terminal cancer, where he performed his own interpretation of Bob Dylan songs. Totta had also started making an album together with Mikael Wiehe, with Dylan songs translated to Swedish, but this was interrupted when he suddenly died.

Death
Totta Näslund died on 19 June 2005 of liver cancer. He was scheduled to perform in his hometown Köpmanholmen the next day. He was 60 years old.

Selected discography 

With Nationalteatern
1976 - Kåldolmar och kalsipper
1978 - Barn av vår tid
1980 - Rövarkungens ö
1987 - Peter Pan

With Tottas Bluesband
1981 - Live at Renströmska
1983 - Saturday night boogie woogie
1985 - Combination boogie
1988 - Compilation boogie (1981–1986)
2003 - Sitting on top of the world

As a solo artist
1995 - Totta
1996 - Totta 2 - Hjärtats slutna rum
1999 - Totta 3 - En dåre som jag
2001 - Totta 4 - Duetterna
2002 - Totta 5 - Turnén
2002 - Totta 6 - Bortom månen & mars
2004 - Totta 7 - Soul på drift
2005 - Totta 8 - Greatest Hits - Bättre begagnat
2006 - Totta & Wiehe - Dylan, posthumous, songs by Bob Dylan translated to Swedish, together with Mikael Wiehe

Filmography 
Vildängel (1997) (film)
Blueprint (1992) (mini-series) 
Som man ropar (1987) (TV series)
Taxibilder (1984) (mini-series)
Tryggare kan ingen vara (1984) (TV series)

External links
Nationalteatern 

1945 births
2005 deaths
People from Sandviken Municipality
Swedish rock musicians
20th-century Swedish male singers
Deaths from liver cancer
Deaths from cancer in Sweden